SS Carl E. Ladd was a Liberty ship built in the United States during World War II. She was named after Carl E. Ladd, a researcher and professor in the field of agriculture, and a university administrator.  Ladd was the Director of Extension of the New York State College of Agriculture at Cornell, and the dean of the colleges of agriculture and home economics at Cornell from 1932-1943.

Construction 
Carl E. Ladd was laid down on 19 June 1944, under a Maritime Commission (MARCOM) contract, MC hull 2312, by J.A. Jones Construction, Panama City, Florida; she was sponsored by Mrs. Carl E. Ladd, the widow of the namesake, and launched on 26 July 1944.

History
She was allocated to States Marine Corporation, 11 August 1944, transferred to the Burns Steamship Company, 10 March 1945, and the American Haw. Steamship Co., 27 February 1947. On 5 October 1948, she was laid up in the National Defense Reserve Fleet, in Astoria, Oregon.

On 7 June 1954, she was withdrawn from the fleet to be loaded with grain as part of the "Grain Program 1954". She returned to the fleet on 23 June 1954, full of grain. On 7 October 1957, she was withdrawn to unload, she returned empty on 12 October 1957. On 6 July 1967, she was sold, for $51,700 to Universal Salvage and Construction Co., to be scrapped. She was withdrawn from the fleet on 30 September 1967.

References

Bibliography 

 
 
 
 

 

Liberty ships
Ships built in Panama City, Florida
1944 ships
Astoria Reserve Fleet
Astoria Reserve Fleet Grain Program